RalliSport Challenge 2 is a 2004 rally racing video game, and the sequel to 2002’s RalliSport Challenge. This game contains new features such as a cockpit cameras and ability to change car at the last moment. However, stats like total horsepower and number of gears have been eliminated from the car selection screen.

Cars are split up into five categories with two subcategories each plus "Classic" cars. There are four paint schemes on each car and drivers must drive 31, 87, and 249 miles before unlocking a new one. By winning all championships in the career mode, all paint schemes for all cars are unlocked.

Gameplay
Multiplayer modes allowed for use of multiple Xbox consoles to be connected together to extend local competition to a maximum of sixteen players from the normal four.

Cars

Rally
The first category of car is the basic Rally type. Each of these cars have 6 gears and AWD.  These cars can be used in Rally and Crossover races in single player, and like all of the cars, can be used for any race in multiplayer.
Some cars include the Hyundai Accent Evo 3, Mitsubishi Lancer Evolution VIII, Seat Cordoba Evo 3, Skoda Octavia RS, Ford Focus Air Force Reserve, Subaru Impreza WRX, Peugeot 206, and the Citroen Xsara T4.

Group B
The second category of cars is the Group B class, all of which are 5-speed monsters that accelerate quickly and are very difficult for novices to control. These cars all took part in the original Group B races.  However, these overpowered supercars of rally were retired in 1986.  Most superrally stages feature Group B cars exclusively.

Ice Racing
Another class of cars is Ice Racing, used for racing on a slick bed of ice. Acceleration is the same as a conventional rally car but a lower gear ratio and only 4 speeds gives these cars a top speed of about 125 mph (about 200 km/h). Also, some of these cars have 4 wheel steering.

Rallycross
Rallycross cars are used for racing on closed circuit arenas at "high speeds". These cars are the fastest accelerating cars but slowest top speeds and if the gear ratios are set a certain way, cars may only go 100 mph.

Hillclimb
The fifth class of cars are the Hill Climb cars. They feature extra muscle in order to climb up and/or speed down mountain slopes. Hill climb cars top out the fastest at over 160 mph (about 260 km/h). Although tricky to control, these 6-speed muscle machines can be suitable for most rallies.

Classics
There are three classic cars in RalliSport Challenge 2. They are very similar to the Group B cars, except for slower acceleration and easier controls. The classics are unlocked each time you complete a circuit in career mode.

Reception

The game received "generally favorable reviews" according to the review aggregation website Metacritic.  In Japan, where the game was ported on 10 June 2004, Famitsu gave it a score of all four eights for a total of 32 out of 40. GameSpot named it the best Xbox game of May 2004. It received a runner-up position in GameSpot's 2004 "Best Driving Game" award category across all platforms, losing to Burnout 3: Takedown.

References

External links

2004 video games
Digital Illusions CE games
Rally racing video games
Video games developed in Sweden
Video games scored by Olof Gustafsson
Video games scored by Tom Salta
Xbox games
Xbox-only games